Anton Kirov (born 22 July 1990) is a Bulgarian footballer who plays as a defender.

Career
On 5 May 2017, Kirov was removed from Minyor Pernik's first team but was restored at the beginning of the 2017–18 season.

References

External links
 
 

1990 births
Living people
Bulgarian footballers
First Professional Football League (Bulgaria) players
Second Professional Football League (Bulgaria) players
FC Chavdar Etropole players
PFC Pirin Gotse Delchev players
PFC Minyor Pernik players
FC Oborishte players
Association football defenders